Ferunabad (also Romanized as Ferūnābād, Farenābād, Farnābād, Farvānābād, Fir‘aunābād, Firīnīābād, Forunābād Froonābād) is a city in the Central District of Pakdasht County, Tehran province, Iran.

At the 2006 census, its population was 12,632 in 3,027 households, when it was a village. The following census in 2011 counted 14,437 people in 3,933 households, by which time the village had been elevated to the status of a city. The latest census in 2016 showed a population of 21,682 people in 6,372 households.

References 

Pakdasht County

Cities in Tehran Province

Populated places in Tehran Province

Populated places in Pakdasht County